These are the official results of the 2007 North American, Central American and Caribbean Championships which took place on July 13–15, 2007 in San Salvador, El Salvador.

Men's results

100 meters

HeatsWind:Heat 1: +1.7 m/s, Heat 2: -1.9 m/s, Heat 3: -0.3 m/s

FinalWind:+0.8 m/s

200 meters

HeatsWind:Heat 1: -0.8 m/s, Heat 2: -0.3 m/s, Heat 3: -0.9 m/s

FinalWind:+1.8 m/s

400 meters

Heats

Final

800 meters

Heats

Final

1500 meters

5000 meters

10,000 meters

110 meters hurdles

HeatsWind:Heat 1: +0.3 m/s, Heat 2: +1.5 m/s

FinalWind:-1.1 m/s

400 meters hurdles

Heats

Final

3000 meters steeplechase

4 x 100 meters relay

4 x 400 meters relay

20,000 meters walk

High jump

Pole vault

Long jump

Triple jump

Shot put

Discus throw

Hammer throw

Javelin throw

Decathlon

Women's results

100 meters

HeatsWind:Heat 1: -1.2 m/s, Heat 2: +0.8 m/s, Heat 3: +0.9 m/s

FinalWind:-0.3 m/s

200 meters

HeatsWind:Heat 1: +2.5 m/s, Heat 2: +2.7 m/s

FinalWind:+2.2 m/s

400 meters

Heats

Final

800 meters

1500 meters

5000 meters

110 meters hurdles

HeatsWind:Heat 1: +0.4 m/s, Heat 2: +1.8 m/s

FinalWind:+0.2 m/s

400 meters hurdles

3000 meters steeplechase

4 x 100 meters relay

4 x 400 meters relay

10,000 meters walk

High jump

Pole vault

Long jump

Triple jump

Shot put

Discus throw

Hammer throw

Javelin throw

Heptathlon

References
Results

NACAC Championships
Events at the NACAC Championships in Athletics